Kennyd Lucas Rodrigues de Lima (born 6 March 2004), known as Kennyd, is a Brazilian footballer who plays as a forward for Goiás.

Club career
Born in Cuiabá, Kennyd passed through the academies of Brasilis-SP, Flamengo, Corinthians and Bahia. While at Flamengo, he was one of the survivors of the Flamengo training ground fire in 2019, which took the lives of ten youth players.

In 2021, he signed for Cuiabá, marking his debut with the under-17 squad by scoring four goals in an 8–0 win over Operário-VG. He signed a contract renewal with the club in August 2022.

In March 2023, Kennyd signed for Goiás.

Career statistics

Club

Notes

References

2004 births
Living people
Brazilian footballers
Association football forwards
CR Flamengo footballers
Sport Club Corinthians Paulista players
Esporte Clube Bahia players
Cuiabá Esporte Clube players
Goiás Esporte Clube players